Energy Star (trademarked ENERGY STAR) is a  program run by the U.S. Environmental Protection Agency (EPA)  and U.S. Department of Energy (DOE) that promotes energy efficiency. The program provides information on the energy consumption of products and devices using different standardized methods. The Energy Star label is found on more than 75 different certified product categories, homes, commercial buildings, and industrial plants. In the United States, the Energy Star label is also shown on the Energy Guide appliance label of qualifying products.

Elements of the Energy Star Program are being implemented in Japan, Taiwan, and Switzerland, as well as by Energy Star Canada. In 2018, a 15-year long agreement with the European Union expired. A previous agreement with the European Free Trade Association has expired.

History
The Energy Star program was established by the Environmental Protection Agency in 1992 and operates under the authority of the Clean Air Act, section 103(g), and the 2005 Energy Policy Act, section 131 (which amended the Energy Policy and Conservation Act, section 324). Since 1992, Energy Star and its partners are estimated to have reduced various energy bills by at least $430 billion.

The EPA manages Energy Star products, as well as home and commercial/industrial programs. The EPA develops and manages Energy Star Portfolio Manager, an online energy tracking and benchmarking tool for commercial buildings. The DOE manages Home Performance with Energy Star and provides technical support, including test procedure development for products and some verification testing of products.

Initiated as a voluntary labeling program designed to identify and promote energy efficient products, Energy Star began with labels for computer and printer products. In 1995 the program was significantly expanded, introducing labels for residential heating and cooling systems and new homes. In 2000, the Consortium for Energy Efficiency was directed by members to begin an annual survey of Energy Star impact.

According to the U.S. Energy and Employment Report for 2016, 290,000 American workers are involved in the manufacture of Energy Star certified products and building materials. The report also projects that employment in energy efficiency will grow much faster than other areas of the energy sector—9 percent in 2017 vs. average projected growth of 5 percent across all of the energy sector—and that Energy Star will be an integral part of that market.

Specifications
Energy Star specifications differ with each item, and are set by the EPA.

Computers
Energy Star 4.0 specifications for computers became effective on July 20, 2007. The requirements are more stringent than the previous specification and existing equipment designs can no longer use the service mark unless re-qualified. They require the use of 80 Plus Bronze level or higher power supplies. Energy Star 5.0 became effective on July 1, 2009. Energy Star 6.1 became effective on September 10, 2014. Energy Star 7.1 became effective on November 16, 2018. The Version 8.0 specification for computers was finalized on October 15, 2019 and became effective on October 15, 2020.

Servers

The EPA released Version 1.0 of the Computer Server specifications on May 15, 2009. It covered standalone servers with one to four processor sockets. A second tier to the specification adding active state power and performance reporting for all qualified servers, as well as blade and multi-node server idle state requirements became effective December 16, 2013. The Version 2.0 Energy Star specification for Computer Servers came into effect on December 16, 2013. The Version 3.0 Energy Star specification for Enterprise Servers came into effect on June 17, 2019 .

Appliances

As of early 2008, average refrigerators need 20% savings over the minimum standard. Dishwashers need at least 41% savings. Most appliances as well as heating and cooling systems have a yellow EnergyGuide label showing the annual cost of operation compared to other models. This label is created through the Federal Trade Commission and often shows if an appliance is Energy Star rated. While an Energy Star label indicates that the appliance is more energy efficient than the minimum guidelines, purchasing an Energy Star labeled product does not always mean one is getting the most energy efficient option available. Thus a higher-capacity but non-Energy Star rated dehumidifier may be a more energy efficient alternative than an Energy Star rated but lower-capacity model. The Energy Star program's savings calculator has also been criticized for unrealistic assumptions in its model that tend to magnify savings benefits to the average consumer.

Another factor yet to be considered by the EPA and DOE is the overall effect of energy-saving requirements on the durability and expected service life of a mass-market appliance built to a consumer-level cost standard. For example, a refrigerator may be made more efficient by the use of more insulative spacing and a smaller-capacity compressor using electronics to control operation and temperature. However, this may come at the cost of reduced interior storage (or increased exterior mass) or a reduced service life due to compressor or electronic failures. In particular, electronic controls used on new-generation appliances are subject to damage from shock, vibration, moisture, or power spikes on the electrical circuit to which they are attached. Critics have pointed out that even if a new appliance is energy efficient, any consumer appliance that does not provide customer satisfaction, or must be replaced twice as often as its predecessor contributes to landfill pollution and waste of natural resources used to construct its replacement.

Heating and cooling systems
Energy Star qualified heat pumps, boilers, air conditioning systems, and furnaces are available. In addition, cooling and heating bills can be significantly lowered with air sealing and duct sealing. Air sealing reduces the outdoor air that penetrates a building, and duct sealing prevents attic or basement air from entering ducts and lessening the heating/cooling system’s efficiency. Energy Star qualified room air conditioners are at least 10% more energy efficient than the minimum U.S. federal government standards.

Home electronics
Energy Star qualified televisions use 30% less energy than average. In November 2008, television specifications were improved to limit on-mode power use, in addition to standby power which is limited by the current specifications. Standby power consumption for televisions must be 3 watts or less.  A wider range of Energy Star qualified televisions will be available.

Other qualified home electronics include cordless phones, battery chargers, VCRs and external power adapters, most of which use 90% less energy.

Imaging equipment
The Energy Star Program Requirements for Imaging Products are focused on product families such as electrophotographic (EP) printers, inkjet printers (e.g., thermal), copiers, facsimile machines and other imaging equipment including MFD's (multifunctional devices). Typical Electrical Consumption (TEC) of a product family are measured and reported against an allowance set by the maximum throughput of the device. Operation modes (OM) are measured and reported for devices such as inkjet products against an allowance set by the functions present in the EUT (equipment under test). Devices that included "adders" such as Ethernet, on-board memory, wireless, etc. are mathematically "added" to increase the OM allowance. Recently on February 1, 2011, the EPA/DOE added the requirement that all products registered under the Energy Star service mark, must be tested by an AB (Accredited Body) or CB (Certification Body) Laboratory.

Lighting

The Energy Star is awarded to only certain bulbs that meet strict efficiency, quality, and lifetime criteria. Energy Star qualified fluorescent lighting uses 75% less energy and lasts up to ten times longer than normal incandescent lights.

Energy Star Qualified light-emitting diode (LED) Lighting:
 Reduces energy costs — uses only 20–25% of the electricity that incandescent bulbs use, and last as much as 25 times as long. LEDs use 25%-30% of the amount of energy as halogen incandescent bulbs, and last 8–25 times as long.
 Reduces cooling costs — LEDs produce very little heat.

To qualify for Energy Star certification, LED lighting products must pass a variety of tests to prove that the products will display the following characteristics:
 Brightness is equal to or greater than existing lighting technologies (incandescent or fluorescent) and light is well distributed over the area lighted by the fixture.
 Light output remains constant over time, only decreasing towards the end of the rated lifetime (at least 35,000 hours or 12 years based on use of 8 hours per day).
 Excellent color quality. The shade of white light appears clear and consistent over time.
 Efficiency is as good as or better than fluorescent lighting.
 Light comes on instantly when turned on.
 No flicker when dimmed.
 No off-state power draw. The fixture does not use power when it is turned off, with the exception of external controls, whose power should not exceed 0.5 watts in the off state.

New Homes
New homes or apartments that earn the Energy Star label have been verified to meet energy efficiency requirements set by U.S. EPA. Energy Star certified homes are at least 10% more efficient than homes built to code and achieve a 20% improvement on average, while providing homeowners with better quality, performance, and comfort. Nearly 1.9 million Energy Star certified homes and apartments have been certified to date. These high-performing homes can be found across the U.S. and include a complete thermal enclosure system, a high-efficiency heating, ventilation and cooling system, a comprehensive water management system, and energy-efficient lighting and appliances. Together, U.S. homeowners living in certified homes saved $360 million on their energy bills in 2016 alone. In 2020, ENERGY STAR separated single-family and multifamily construction types into their own programs: Single-Family New Construction (SFNC) and Multifamily New Construction (MFNC).

A new tier of ENERGY STAR certification, called the ENERGY STAR NextGen Certified Homes and Apartments, will be launched in 2023. This new certification uses a baseline of the ENERGY STAR Single-Family and Multifamily certification, with additional requirements such as heat pump water heaters and EV-ready charging capabilities.

Energy performance ratings
The Energy Star program has developed energy performance rating systems for several commercial and institutional building types and manufacturing facilities. These ratings, on a scale of 1 to 100, provide a means for benchmarking the energy efficiency of specific buildings and industrial plants against the energy performance of similar facilities. The ratings are used by building and energy managers to evaluate the energy performance of existing buildings and industrial plants. The rating systems are also used by EPA to determine if a building or plant can qualify to earn Energy Star recognition.

For many types of commercial buildings, one can enter energy information into EPA's free online tool, Portfolio Manager, and it will calculate a score for one's building on a scale of 1–100. Buildings that score a 75 or greater may qualify for the Energy Star. Portfolio Manager is an interactive energy management tool that allows one to track and assess energy and water consumption across one's entire portfolio of buildings in a secure online environment. Whether one owns, manages, or holds properties for investment, Portfolio Manager can help one set investment priorities, identify under-performing buildings, verify efficiency improvements, and receive EPA recognition for superior energy performance. Portfolio Manager uses an automated benchmarking tool that can award Energy Star certification to buildings that have uploaded 12 months of consecutive energy usage data and received scores of 75 or above.

In 2020 energystar.gov released an updated guide for verifying Energy Star certifications.

Energy Star ratings have been compared to other clean energy rating systems and green building certification systems such as those by independent firms like MiQ, or LEED certifications for office buildings.

Buildings

The number of space types that can receive the energy performance rating in Portfolio Manager is expanding and now includes housing, bank/financial institutions, courthouses, hospitals (acute care and children's), hotels and motels, houses of worship, K-12 schools, medical offices, offices, residence halls/dormitories, retail stores, supermarkets, warehouses (refrigerated and non-refrigerated), data centers, senior care facilities, and wastewater facilities.

See the technical descriptions for models used in the rating system at. These documents provide detailed information on the methodologies used to create the energy performance ratings including details on rating objectives, regression techniques, and the steps applied to compute a rating. A 1–100 rating can be generated for ratable space types by entering building attributes, such as square footage and weekly operating hours, and monthly energy consumption data into Portfolio Manager, a free online tool provided by Energy Star. This process is known as benchmarking and reveals how a building's energy consumption compares to that of other similar buildings of the same space type, based on a national average. Earning a rating of 75 or above is the first step towards achieving the Energy Star for a building.

Energy Star energy performance ratings have been incorporated into some green buildings standards, such as LEED for Existing Buildings. In the U.S., builders of energy efficient homes are able to qualify for Federal Income tax credits and deductions.

Energystar.gov estimated that energy use in commercial buildings accounts for 20% of greenhouse gas emissions, costing more than $100B per year.

Industrial facilities
Energy performance ratings have been released for the following industrial facilities:
 Automobile assembly plants
 Cement plants
 Wet corn mills
 Container glass manufacturing
 Flat glass manufacturing
 Frozen fried potato processing plants
 Juice processing
 Petroleum refineries
 Pharmaceutical manufacturing plants

Small business award 

The U.S. Environmental Protection Agency (EPA) annually recognizes small businesses that demonstrate abilities to reduce waste, conserve energy, and recycle. The businesses use resources and ideas outlined in the Energy Star program. The award was established in 1999.

Controversies
In March 2010, the Government Accountability Office (GAO) performed covert testing of the Energy Star product certification process and found that Energy Star was for the most part a self-certification program that was vulnerable to fraud and abuse. While the GAO demonstrated, by submitting fake products from made-up companies, that cheating was possible, they found no evidence of consumer fraud relating to the quality or performance of Energy Star qualified products.

In response, the Environmental Protection Agency instituted third-party certification of all Energy Star products starting in 2011. Under this regime, products are tested in an EPA-recognized laboratory and reviewed by an EPA-recognized certification body before they can carry the label. In order to be recognized, labs and certification bodies must meet specified criteria and be subject to oversight by a recognized accreditation body. In addition, a percentage of Energy Star certified product models in each category are subject to off-the-shelf verification testing each year.

As of 2017, there are 23 independent certification bodies and 255 independent laboratories recognized for purposes of Energy Star product certification and testing. Most cover multiple product types. In 2016, 1,881 product models were subject to verification testing with an overall compliance rate of 95%.

In March 2017 the Trump Administration proposed a budget that would eliminate the program. This prompted an outpouring of expressions of support for the Energy Star program from environmental groups, energy efficiency advocates, and businesses.

Adoption in building codes 
The current and projected status of energy codes and standards adoption is show in the maps at the link.

The following cities have mandatory reporting requirements.
 Atlanta, GA
 Austin, TX
 Boston, MA
 Minneapolis, MN
 New York, NY
 Philadelphia, PA
 San Francisco, CA
 Seattle, WA
 Washington, DC

See also

 ASUE (Germany)
 Bureau of Energy Efficiency India
 Energy performance certificate
 EnerWorks
 European Union energy label
 Green computing
 Green energy
 House Energy Rating (Australia)
 Miscellaneous electric load
 One Watt Initiative
 Plug load
 Power management
 Weatherization

References

External links
 Energy Star
 Energy Star Australia
 Energy Star Canada
 Energy Consumption Calculator
 Energy Star entry at Ecolabelling.org
 Energy Efficiency Breakdown of the costs, savings, and energy efficiency of Energy Star appliances
 Energy Star qualified Energy Service & Product Providers list
 EPA recognized Certification Bodies (CBs) and Laboratories
 Energy Star 5.0 Computer specification (November 14, 2008)
 10 CFR 430, Subpart B, Appendix A to Subpart B of Part 430 – Uniform Test Method for Measuring the Energy Consumption of Electric Refrigerators and Electric Refrigerator–Freezers

Product certification
Energy conservation in the United States
Environmental certification marks
Symbols introduced in 1992
1992 establishments in the United States